The R602 is a Regional Route in South Africa.

Route
Its north-eastern terminus is Dundee at an intersection with the R68. It initially heads west, to the twin town of Glencoe. It then runs south-west, bypassing Wasbank, to end at an intersection with the N11 between Ladysmith, KwaZulu-Natal and Newcastle, KwaZulu-Natal.

References

Regional Routes in KwaZulu-Natal